In enzymology, a N-acetyl-gamma-glutamyl-phosphate reductase is an enzyme that catalyzes the chemical reaction

N-acetyl-L-glutamate 5-semialdehyde + NADP+ + phosphate  N-acetyl-L-glutamyl 5-phosphate + NADPH + H+

The 3 substrates of this enzyme are N-acetyl-L-glutamate 5-semialdehyde, NADP+, and phosphate, whereas its 3 products are N-acetyl-L-glutamyl 5-phosphate, NADPH, and H+.

This enzyme belongs to the family of oxidoreductases, specifically those acting on the aldehyde or oxo group of donor with NAD+ or NADP+ as acceptor.  The systematic name of this enzyme class is N-acetyl-L-glutamate-5-semialdehyde:NADP+ 5-oxidoreductase (phosphorylating). Other names in common use include reductase, acetyl-gamma-glutamyl phosphate, N-acetylglutamate 5-semialdehyde dehydrogenase, N-acetylglutamic gamma-semialdehyde dehydrogenase, N-acetyl-L-glutamate gamma-semialdehyde:NADP+ oxidoreductase, and (phosphorylating).  This enzyme participates in urea cycle and metabolism of amino groups.

Structural studies

References

 
 

EC 1.2.1
NADPH-dependent enzymes
Enzymes of known structure